Funny Times may refer to:
 Funny Times (newspaper), an American humor newspaper
 Funny Times (Harry Hill album), 2010
 Funny Times (Misty's Big Adventure album), 2007